The Giza pyramid complex (also called the Giza necropolis) in Egypt is home to the Great Pyramid, the Pyramid of Khafre, and the Pyramid of Menkaure, along with their associated pyramid complexes and the Great Sphinx. All were built during the Fourth Dynasty of the Old Kingdom of ancient Egypt, between 2500 and 2600 BC. The site also includes several temples and cemeteries and the remains of a workers' village.

It forms the northernmost part of the  Pyramid Fields of the Memphis and its Necropolis UNESCO World Heritage Site, inscribed in 1979. The pyramid fields include the Abu Sir, Saqarra and Dahshur pyramid complexes, that were all built in the vicinity of Egypt's ancient capital of Memphis.

The Great Pyramid and the Pyramid of Khafre are the largest pyramids built in ancient Egypt, and they have historically been common as emblems of Ancient Egypt in the Western imagination. They were popularised in Hellenistic times, when the Great Pyramid was listed by Antipater of Sidon as one of the Seven Wonders of the World. It is by far the oldest of the Ancient Wonders and the only one still in existence.

Pyramids and Sphinx

The Giza pyramid complex consists of the Great Pyramid (also known as the Pyramid of Cheops or Khufu and constructed ), the somewhat smaller Pyramid of Khafre (or Chephren) a few hundred metres to the south-west, and the relatively modest-sized Pyramid of Menkaure (or Mykerinos) a few hundred metres farther south-west. The Great Sphinx lies on the east side of the complex. Current consensus among Egyptologists is that the head of the Great Sphinx is that of Khafre. Along with these major monuments are a number of smaller satellite edifices, known as "queens" pyramids, causeways and temples.

Khufu's complex

Khufu's pyramid complex consists of a valley temple, now buried beneath the village of Nazlet el-Samman; diabase paving and nummulitic limestone walls have been found but the site has not been excavated. The valley temple was connected to a causeway which was largely destroyed when the village was constructed. The causeway led to the Mortuary Temple of Khufu. Of this temple, the basalt pavement is the only thing that remains. The mortuary temple was connected to the king's pyramid. The king's pyramid, completed in 2560 BC, has three smaller queen's pyramids associated with it and three boat pits. The boat pits contained a ship, and the two pits on the south side of the pyramid still contained intact ships when excavated. One of these ships, the Khufu ship, has been restored and was originally displayed at the Giza Solar boat museum, then subsequently moved to the Grand Egyptian Museum.

Khufu's pyramid still has a limited number of casing stones at its base. These casing stones were made of fine white limestone quarried from the nearby range.

Khafre's complex

Khafre's pyramid complex consists of a valley temple, the Sphinx temple, a causeway, a mortuary temple and the king's pyramid. The valley temple yielded several statues of Khafre. Several were found in a well in the floor of the temple by Mariette in 1860. Others were found during successive excavations by Sieglin (1909–10), Junker, Reisner, and Hassan. Khafre's complex contained five boat-pits and a subsidiary pyramid with a serdab.
Khafre's pyramid, completed in 2570 BC, appears larger than the adjacent Khufu Pyramid by virtue of its more elevated location, and the steeper angle of inclination of its construction—it is, in fact, smaller in both height and volume. Khafre's pyramid retains a prominent display of casing stones at its apex.

Menkaure's complex

Menkaure's pyramid complex consists of a valley temple, a causeway, a mortuary temple, and the king's pyramid. The valley temple once contained several statues of Menkaure. During the 5th Dynasty, a smaller ante-temple was added on to the valley temple. The mortuary temple also yielded several statues of Menkaure. The king's pyramid, completed ca. 2510 BC, has three subsidiary or queen's pyramids.
Of the four major monuments, only Menkaure's pyramid is seen today without any of its original polished limestone casing.

Sphinx

The Sphinx dates from the reign of king Khafre. During the New Kingdom, Amenhotep II dedicated a new temple to Hauron-Haremakhet and this structure was added onto by later rulers.

Tomb of Queen Khentkaus I

Khentkaus I was buried in Giza. Her tomb is known as LG 100 and G 8400 and is located in the Central Field, near the valley temple of Menkaure. The pyramid complex of Queen Khentkaus includes: her pyramid, a boat pit, a valley temple and a pyramid town.

Construction

Most construction theories are based on the idea that the pyramids were built by moving huge stones from a quarry and dragging and lifting them into place. Disagreements arise over the feasibility of the different proposed methods by which the stones were conveyed and placed.

In building the pyramids, the architects might have developed their techniques over time. They would select a site on a relatively flat area of bedrock—not sand—which provided a stable foundation. After carefully surveying the site and laying down the first level of stones, they constructed the pyramids in horizontal levels, one on top of the other.

For the Great Pyramid, most of the stone for the interior seems to have been quarried immediately to the south of the construction site. The smooth exterior of the pyramid was made of a fine grade of white limestone that was quarried across the Nile. These exterior blocks had to be carefully cut, transported by river barge to Giza, and dragged up ramps to the construction site. Only a few exterior blocks remain in place at the bottom of the Great Pyramid. During the Middle Ages (5th century to 15th century), people may have taken the rest away for building projects in the city of Cairo.

To ensure that the pyramid remained symmetrical, the exterior casing stones all had to be equal in height and width. Workers might have marked all the blocks to indicate the angle of the pyramid wall and trimmed the surfaces carefully so that the blocks fit together. During construction, the outer surface of the stone was smooth limestone; excess stone has eroded over time.

Purpose
The pyramids of Giza and others are thought to have been constructed to house the remains of the deceased pharaohs who ruled over Ancient Egypt. A portion of the pharaoh's spirit called his ka was believed to remain with his corpse. Proper care of the remains was necessary in order for the "former Pharaoh to perform his new duties as king of the dead". It is theorized the pyramid not only served as a tomb for the pharaoh, but also as a storage pit for various items he would need in the afterlife. "The people of Ancient Egypt believed that death on Earth was the start of a journey to the next world." The embalmed body of the King was entombed underneath or within the pyramid to protect it and allow his transformation and ascension to the afterlife.

Astronomy

The sides of all three of the Giza pyramids were astronomically oriented to the north–south and east–west within a small fraction of a degree. Among recent attempts to explain such a clearly deliberate pattern are those of S. Haack, O. Neugebauer, K. Spence, D. Rawlins, K. Pickering, and J. Belmonte. The arrangement of the pyramids is a representation of the Orion constellation according to the disputed Orion correlation theory.

Workers' village

The work of quarrying, moving, setting, and sculpting the huge amount of stone used to build the pyramids might have been accomplished by several thousand skilled workers, unskilled laborers and supporting workers. Bakers, carpenters, water carriers, and others were also needed for the project. Along with the methods utilized to construct the pyramids, there is also wide speculation regarding the exact number of workers needed for a building project of this magnitude. When Greek historian Herodotus visited Giza in 450 BC, he was told by Egyptian priests that "the Great Pyramid had taken 400,000 men 20 years to build, working in three-month shifts 100,000 men at a time." Evidence from the tombs indicates that a workforce of 10,000 laborers working in three-month shifts took around 30 years to build a pyramid.

The Giza pyramid complex is surrounded by a large stone wall, outside which Mark Lehner and his team discovered a town where the pyramid workers were housed. The village is located to the southeast of the Khafre and Menkaure complexes. Among the discoveries at the workers' village are communal sleeping quarters, bakeries, breweries, and kitchens (with evidence showing that bread, beef, and fish were staples of the diet), a hospital and a cemetery (where some of the skeletons were found with signs of trauma associated with accidents on a building site). The workers' town appears to date from the middle 4th Dynasty (2520–2472 BC), after the accepted time of Khufu and completion of the Great Pyramid. According to Lehner and the AERA team:

 The development of this urban complex must have been quite rapid. All of the construction probably happened in the 35 to 50 years that spanned the reigns of Khafre and Menkaure, builders of the Second and Third Giza Pyramids.

Without carbon dating, using only pottery shards, seal impressions, and stratigraphy to date the site, the team further concludes.

 The picture that emerges is that of a planned settlement, some of the world's earliest urban planning, securely dated to the reigns of two Giza pyramid builders: Khafre (2520–2494 BC) and Menkaure (2490–2472 BC).

Cemeteries
As the pyramids were constructed, the mastabas for lesser royals were constructed around them. Near the pyramid of Khufu, the main cemetery is G 7000, which lies in the East Field located to the east of the main pyramid and next to the Queen's pyramids. These cemeteries around the pyramids were arranged along streets and avenues. Cemetery G 7000 was one of the earliest and contained tombs of wives, sons and daughters of these 4th Dynasty rulers. On the other side of the pyramid in the West Field, the royals sons Wepemnofret and Hemiunu were buried in Cemetery G 1200 and Cemetery G 4000 respectively. These cemeteries were further expanded during the 5th and 6th Dynasties.

West Field

The West Field is located to the west of Khufu's pyramid. It is divided into smaller areas such as the cemeteries referred to as the Abu Bakr Excavations (1949–50, 1950–1,1952 and 1953), and several cemeteries named based on the mastaba numbers such as Cemetery G 1000, Cemetery G 1100, etc. The West Field contains Cemetery G1000 – Cemetery G1600, and Cemetery G 1900. Further cemeteries in this field are: Cemeteries G 2000, G 2200, G 2500, G 3000, G 4000, and G 6000. Three other cemeteries are named after their excavators: Junker Cemetery West, Junker Cemetery East and Steindorff Cemetery.

East Field

The East Field is located to the east of Khufu's pyramid and contains cemetery G 7000. This cemetery was a burial place for some of the family members of Khufu.
The cemetery also includes mastabas from tenants and priests of the pyramids dated to the 5th Dynasty and 6th Dynasty.

Cemetery GIS

This cemetery dates from the time of Menkaure (Junker) or earlier (Reisner), and contains several stone-built mastabas dating from as late as the 6th Dynasty. Tombs from the time of Menkaure include the mastabas of the royal chamberlain Khaemnefert, the King's son Khufudjedef (master of the royal largesse), and an official named Niankhre.

Central Field

The Central Field contains several burials of royal family members. The tombs range in date from the end of the 4th Dynasty to the 5th Dynasty or even later.

Tombs dating from the Saite and later period were found near the causeway of Khafre and the Great Sphinx. These tombs include the tomb of a commander of the army named Ahmose and his mother Queen Nakhtubasterau, who was the wife of Pharaoh Amasis II.

South Field
The South Field includes mastabas dating from the 1st Dynasty to 3rd Dynasty as well as later burials. Of the more significant of these early dynastic tombs are one referred to as "Covington's tomb", otherwise known as Mastaba T, and the large Mastaba V which contained artifacts naming the 1st Dynasty pharaoh Djet. Other tombs date from the late Old Kingdom (5th and 6th Dynasty). The south section of the field contains several tombs dating from the Saite period and later.

Tombs of the pyramid builders
In 1990, tombs belonging to the pyramid workers were discovered alongside the pyramids, with an additional burial site found nearby in 2009. Although not mummified, they had been buried in mudbrick tombs with beer and bread to support them in the afterlife. The tombs' proximity to the pyramids and the manner of burial supports the theory that they were paid laborers who took great pride in their work and were not slaves, as was previously thought. Evidence from the tombs indicates that a workforce of 10,000 laborers working in three-month shifts took around 30 years to build a pyramid. Most of the workers appear to have come from poor families. Specialists such as architects, masons, metalworkers and carpenters, were permanently employed by the king to fill positions that required the most skill.

Shafts 
There are multiple burial-shafts and various unfinished shafts and tunnels located in the Giza complex discovered and mentioned prominently by Selim Hassan in his Excavations at Giza 1933-1934 report. "Very few of the Saitic [referring to the Saitic Period.] shafts have been thoroughly examined, for the reason that most of them are flooded."

Osiris Shaft 
The Osiris Shaft is a narrow burial-shaft leading to three levels for a tomb and below it a flooded area. It was first mentioned by Selim Hassan. A thorough excavation was conducted by a team led by Hawass in 1999. It was opened to tourists in November 2017.

New Kingdom and Late Period

During the New Kingdom Giza was still an active site. A brick-built chapel was constructed near the Sphinx during the early 18th Dynasty, probably by King Thutmose I. Amenhotep II built a temple dedicated to Hauron-Haremakhet near the Sphinx. As a prince, the future pharaoh Thutmose IV visited the pyramids and the Sphinx; he reported being told, in a dream, that if he cleared the sand that had built up around the Sphinx, he would be rewarded with kingship. This event is recorded in the Dream Stele, which he had installed between the Sphinx's front legs. During the early years of his reign, Thutmose IV, together with his wife Queen Nefertari, had stelae erected at Giza.

Pharaoh Tutankhamun had a structure built, which is now referred to as the king's resthouse.
During the 19th Dynasty, Seti I added to the temple of Hauron-Haremakhet, and his son Ramesses II erected a stela in the chapel before the Sphinx and usurped the resthouse of Tutankhamun. During the 21st Dynasty, the Temple of Isis Mistress-of-the-Pyramids was reconstructed. During the 26th Dynasty, a stela made in this time mentions Khufu and his Queen Henutsen.

Division of the 1903-1905 excavation of the Giza Necropolis
In 1903, rights to excavate the West Field and Pyramids of the Giza Necropolis were divided by three institutions from Italy, Germany, and the United States of America respectively.

Background
Prior to the division of the Giza Plateau into three institutional concessions in 1903, amateur and private excavations at the Giza Necropolis had been permitted to operate. The work of these amateur archaeologists failed to meet high scientific standards. Montague Ballard, for instance, excavated in the Western Cemetery with the hesitant permission of the Service des Antiquités of Egypt and neither kept records of his finds nor published them.

Italian, German, and American Concessions at Giza
In 1902, the Service des Antiquités under Gaston Maspero, the successor to founder Auguste Mariette, resolved to issue permits exclusively to authorized individuals representing public institutions. In November of that year, the Service awarded three scholars with concessions on the Giza Necropolis. They were the Italian Ernesto Schiaparelli from the Turin Museum, the German Georg Steindorff from the University of Leipzig who had funding from Wilhelm Pelizaeus, and the American George Reisner from the Hearst Expedition. Within a matter of months, the site had been divided between the concessionaires following a meeting at the Mena House Hotel involving Schiaparelli, Ludwig Borchardt (Steindorff’s representative in Egypt), and Reisner.

Division of the West Field
By the turn of the 20th century, the three largest pyramids on the Giza plateau were considered mostly exhausted by previous excavations, so the Western Cemetery and its collection of private mastaba tombs were at the time thought to represent the richest yet unexcavated part of the plateau. George Reisner’s wife, Mary, drew names from a hat to assign three long east-west plots of the necropolis among the Italian, German, and American missions. Schiaparelli was assigned the southernmost strip, Borchardt the center, and Reisner the northernmost.

Division of the Pyramids
Rights to excavate the Pyramids were then also negotiated between Schiaparelli, Borchardt, and Reisner. Schiaparelli gained rights to excavate the Great Pyramid of Khufu along with its three associated queens’ pyramids and most of its Eastern Cemetery.  Borchardt received Khafre’s pyramid, its causeway, the Sphinx, and the Sphinx’s associated temples. Reisner claimed Menkaure’s pyramid as well as its associated queens’ pyramids and pyramid temple, along with a portion of Schiaparelli’s Eastern Cemetery. Any future disputes were to be resolved by Inspector James Quibell, as per a letter from Borchardt to Maspero.

Immediate Aftermath
This arrangement lasted until 1905, when, under the supervision of Schiaparelli and Francesco Ballerini, the Italian excavations ceased at Giza.  As the Italians were more interested in sites which might yield more papyri, they turned their concession of the southern strip of the Western Cemetery over to the Americans under Reisner.

Modern usage
In 1978, the Grateful Dead played a series of concerts later released as Rocking the Cradle: Egypt 1978. In 2007, Colombian singer Shakira performed at the complex to a crowd of approximately 100,000 people. The complex was used for the final draw of the 2019 Africa Cup of Nations and the 2021 World Men's Handball Championship.

Egypt's Minister of Tourism unveiled plans for a  revamp of the complex by the end of 2021, in order to boost tourism in Egypt as well as make the site more accessible and tourist-friendly. According to Lonely Planet, the refurbishment includes a new visitors' centre, an environmentally-friendly electric bus, a restaurant – the 9 Pyramids Lounge, as well as a cinema, public toilets, site-wide signage, food trucks, photo booths, and free Wi-Fi. The new facility is part of a wider plan to renovate the 4,500 year old site.

See also

Egyptian pyramids
List of Egyptian pyramids
List of largest monoliths, includes section on calculating weight of megaliths
Outline of Egypt

References

External links

Giza Plateau / Official Site – Tourist Site
Pyramids in Giza – Pictures of Giza Pyramids published under Creative Commons License.
3D virtual tour explaining Houdin's theory  (plug in needed)
The Giza Archives at Harvard University – Since 2010, the Old Giza Project website  maintained by the Museum of Fine Arts, in Boston, has moved to Harvard University with an improved, expanded website. 

 
Giza Plateau
Pyramids of the Fourth Dynasty of Egypt
Open-air museums in Egypt
World Heritage Sites in Egypt
Archaeological sites in Egypt
Tourist attractions in Egypt
Articles containing video clips
Western Desert (Egypt)